Trio and Solo is an album by American jazz pianist Randy Weston recorded in 1955 and 1956 and released on the Riverside label. Six tracks had previously appeared on the 10-inch LP The Randy Weston Trio released in 1955. The album was later released on CD as Solo, Duo & Trio compiled with Weston's 1955 debut recording Cole Porter in a Modern Mood.

Reception 

Allmusic awarded the album 3 stars, with the review by Alex Henderson stating: "Trio and Solo isn't as essential as some of Weston's 1960s recordings, but for those who are devoted fans of the pianist, these early performances offer considerable rewards".

Track listing 
All compositions by Randy Weston except as indicated
 "Sweet Sue, Just You" (Will J. Harris, Victor Young) - 3:45  
 "Pam's Waltz" - 3:41 
 "Solemn Meditation" (Sam Gill) - 6:49  
 "Again" (Dorcas Cochran, Lionel Newman) - 5:02 
 "Zulu" - 3:27    
 "If You Could See Me Now" (Tadd Dameron, Carl Sigman) - 3:37    
 "Little Girl Blue" (Lorenz Hart, Richard Rodgers) - 3:54   
 "We'll Be Together Again"  (Carl Fischer, Frankie Laine) - 4:08   
 "Softness" - 4:22   
 "Lover"  (Hart, Rodgers) - 4:03  
Recorded at Van Gelder Studio in Hackensack, New Jersey on 25 January 1955 (tracks 1-6) and in New York City on 10 September 1956 (tracks 7-10)

Personnel 
 Randy Weston - piano 
 Sam Gill - bass (tracks 1-5)
 Art Blakey - drums (tracks 1-5)

References 

Randy Weston albums
1956 albums
Riverside Records albums
Albums produced by Orrin Keepnews
Albums recorded at Van Gelder Studio